Jeff Blaine Pickler (born January 6, 1976) is an American professional baseball coach. He is the game planning and outfield coach for the Cincinnati Reds of Major League Baseball (MLB). He has also coached for the Minnesota Twins.

Biography
Pickler was born in Garden Grove, California.  He attended Foothill High School in Santa Ana, California, where he played for the school's baseball team. He then enrolled at Cypress College, where he played college baseball for the Cypress Chargers for one season. He then transferred to the University of Tennessee to continue his college baseball career with the Tennessee Volunteers. In 1997, he played collegiate summer baseball for the Wareham Gatemen of the Cape Cod Baseball League, helping to lead the Gatemen to the league title.

In 1998, Pickler was named the Southeastern Conference Baseball Player of the Year. He graduated magna cum laude from Tennessee. The Milwaukee Brewers selected Pickler in the 11th round of the 1998 Major League Baseball draft; he played in Minor League Baseball for the Brewers, Texas Rangers, and Colorado Rockies organizations for eight years.

After he retired as a player, Pickler became a scout for the Arizona Diamondbacks. After three years with the Diamondbacks, he spent one year as an assistant coach for the Arizona Wildcats of the University of Arizona. He then spent four years as a scout for the San Diego Padres. Pickler joined the front office of the Los Angeles Dodgers in 2014 as a special assistant in professional scouting and player development.

The Twins hired Pickler to their major league coaching staff prior to the 2017 season. The Cincinnati Reds hired him before the 2019 season.

Pickler's father, Scott, is the coach for the Cypress College baseball team and the longtime field manager of the Yarmouth-Dennis Red Sox of the Cape Cod Baseball League.

References

External links

1976 births
Living people
People from Garden Grove, California
Baseball coaches from California
Baseball players from California
Cypress Chargers baseball players
Tennessee Volunteers baseball players
Ogden Raptors players
Huntsville Stars players
Stockton Ports players
Indianapolis Indians players
Tulsa Drillers players
Oklahoma RedHawks players
Colorado Springs Sky Sox players
San Diego Padres scouts
Arizona Diamondbacks scouts
Arizona Wildcats baseball coaches
Los Angeles Dodgers executives
Minnesota Twins coaches
Cincinnati Reds coaches
All-American college baseball players
Wareham Gatemen players